Alistipes shahii is a Gram-negative, strictly anaerobic and rod-shaped bacterium from the genus of Alistipes which has been isolated from human appendix tissue from the United States.

References

Bacteria described in 2006
Bacteroidia